NEXEN is a financial services platform developed by BNY Mellon. It features a web application, APIs, and data analytics tools to allow financial services clients to access the BNY Mellon's services, such as asset custody,  broker-dealer services, and alternative investment services. NEXEN was launched in 2015, and is part of BNY Mellon's digital transformation efforts that began in 2012.

Features

Gateway and App Store 

NEXEN includes Gateway, a web application for users to access BNY Mellon services via browser on desktop, tablet, and mobile device. Gateway is built using open-source technology, such as AngularJS. It provides users access to BNY Mellon services across multiple financial services segments in a single interface. As of June 2016, there are 10,000 entitled users to Gateway.

BNY Mellon plans to include third parties on the NEXEN platform via an app store. An example is a third-party app that performs sentiment analysis on asset managers' portfolio holdings.

APIs 

NEXEN is built using API technology. APIs are used to provide data and functionality to the user interface. Clients can also access more than 100 APIs directly using the NEXEN API Store.  The NEXEN platform uses open-source technology to run the APIs, such as WSO2.

Data analytics 

NEXEN includes data analytics tools through a feature called Digital Pulse. This feature includes capturing more than one billion data events per month and using visual tools to display and analyze the data. Activities, processes and transactions are all tracked via the same analytics feature, resulting in nearly 200 dashboards.

References

External links 

Financial services